The Inlander is an Australian passenger train. It was introduced by Queensland Rail on 12 February 1953 using new steel air-conditioned carriages built by Commonwealth Engineering, Rocklea.

Background
Victorian Railways introduced air-conditioned trains in 1935, and Queensland Rail decided to follow suit in the late 1940s. Steel carriages were designed to travel to all parts of the system, meaning a maximum axle load of 9 tons, which was a challenge for the dining cars. New features included showers in the sleeping cars, roomettes in first class and head end power cars, especially necessary where trains may be delayed by floods or other events, as was often the case.

History

The Inlander was the first air-conditioned train in Queensland, replacing the Mail train with its wooden carriages and providing a more comfortable and cleaner service to this dry and dusty region.

Today

As of September 2020, it operates twice-weekly on the Great Northern line from the coastal city of Townsville to the mining city of Mount Isa. The train is relatively slow, taking 21 hours (overnight) to complete a journey of 977 kilometres. 

The westbound service (3M34) departs Townsville Railway Station at 12:40pm on Wednesdays and Saturdays and arrives at Mount Isa Railway Station at 9:35am on Thursdays and Sundays. 

The eastbound service (3231) departs Mount Isa Railway Station at 1:35pm on Thursdays and Sundays and arrives at Townsville Railway Station at 10:10am on Fridays and Mondays

Until the end of 2014, the train consisted of sitting cars, sleeping cars with roomettes, twinettes and triple sleeping cabins and a club car where food could be purchased.

The sleeping cars were withdrawn from 1 January 2015. 
Catering is provided by at seat snack packs and a dining car.

On 16 June 2021, a $1M Business case was announced by the Queensland State Government to investigate replacement of The Westlander, Spirit of the Outback and Inlander Services' rollingstock.

Subsidy levels

In 2016, the service was estimated to have carried 4,511 people in the previous financial year, with the effective subsidy paid by the Queensland State Government for each passenger amounting to an estimated $3,436 (total subsidy $15.5m).

In 2021, the service carried 2,833 people in the previous financial year, with the effective subsidy paid by the Queensland State Government for each passenger at $5,086.06.

References

External links
The Inlander OpenStreetMap

Named passenger trains of Queensland
Night trains of Australia
Railway services introduced in 1953
1953 establishments in Australia